Elections to Antrim and Newtownabbey Borough Council, part of the Northern Ireland local elections on 2 May 2019, returned 40 members to the council using Single Transferable Vote. The Democratic Unionist Party were the largest party in both first-preference votes and seats.

Election results

Note: "Votes" are the first preference votes.

The overall turnout was 49.07% with a total of 48,526 valid votes cast. A total of 537 ballots were rejected.

Districts summary

|- class="unsortable" align="centre"
!rowspan=2 align="left"|Ward
! % 
!Cllrs
! %
!Cllrs
! %
!Cllrs
! %
!Cllrs
! %
!Cllrs
! %
!Cllrs
!rowspan=2|TotalCllrs
|- class="unsortable" align="center"
!colspan=2 bgcolor="" | DUP
!colspan=2 bgcolor="" | UUP
!colspan=2 bgcolor="" | Alliance
!colspan=2 bgcolor="" | Sinn Féin
!colspan=2 bgcolor=""| SDLP
!colspan=2 bgcolor="white"| Others
|-
|align="left"|Airport
|bgcolor="#D46A4C"|23.3
|bgcolor="#D46A4C"|1
|20.7
|1
|17.3
|1
|22.7
|1
|16.0
|1
|0.0
|0
|5
|-
|align="left"|Antrim
|bgcolor="#D46A4C"|26.4
|bgcolor="#D46A4C"|2
|16.0
|2
|26.3
|1
|9.1
|0
|11.2
|1
|11.0
|0
|6
|-
|align="left"|Ballyclare
|30.2
|2
|bgcolor="40BFF5"|34.0
|bgcolor="40BFF5"|2
|11.5
|0
|0.0
|0
|0.0
|0
|24.3
|1
|5
|-
|align="left"|Dunsilly
|bgcolor="#D46A4C"|28.7
|bgcolor="#D46A4C"|1
|17.4
|1
|15.2
|1
|24.8
|1
|13.8
|1
|0.0
|0
|5
|-
|align="left"|Glengormley Urban
|bgcolor="#D46A4C"|29.3
|bgcolor="#D46A4C"|2
|15.5
|1
|16.9
|1
|21.5
|2
|12.5
|1
|4.3
|0
|7
|-
|align="left"|Macedon
|bgcolor="#D46A4C"|43.0
|bgcolor="#D46A4C"|3
|15.3
|1
|18.0
|1
|12.2
|1
|0.0
|0
|11.6
|0
|6
|-
|align="left"|Three Mile Water
|bgcolor="#D46A4C"|40.1
|bgcolor="#D46A4C"|3
|22.9
|1
|25.9
|2
|0.0
|0
|0.0
|0
|11.0
|0
|6
|-
|- class="unsortable" class="sortbottom" style="background:#C9C9C9"
|align="left"| Total
|31.5
|14
|20.3
|9
|18.7
|7
|13.1
|5
|7.8
|4
|8.7
|1
|40
|-
|}

District results

Airport

2014: 2 x UUP, 1 x Sinn Féin, 1 x SDLP, 1 x DUP
2019: 1 x UUP, 1 x Sinn Féin, 1 x SDLP, 1 x DUP, 1 x Alliance
2014-2019 Change: Alliance gain from UUP

Antrim

2014: 2 x DUP, 2 x UUP, 1 x Alliance, 1 x SDLP
2019: 2 x DUP, 2 x UUP, 1 x Alliance, 1 x SDLP
2014-2019 Change: No change

Ballyclare

2014: 2 x UUP, 2 x DUP, 1 x TUV
2019: 2 x UUP, 2 x DUP, 1 x Independent
2014-2019 Change: Independent gain from TUV

Dunsilly

2014: 2 x DUP, 1 x UUP, 1 x Sinn Féin, 1 x SDLP
2019: 1 x DUP, 1 x UUP, 1 x Sinn Féin, 1 x SDLP, 1 x Alliance
2014-2019 Change: Alliance gain from DUP

Glengormley Urban

2014: 2 x DUP, 2 x UUP, 1 x Sinn Féin, 1 x Alliance, 1 x SDLP
2019: 2 x DUP, 2 x Sinn Féin, 1 x UUP, 1 x Alliance, 1 x SDLP
2014-2019 Change: Sinn Féin gain from UUP

Macedon 

2014: 3 x DUP, 1 x Alliance, 1 X UUP, 1 x TUV
2019: 3 x DUP, 1 x Alliance, 1 x UUP, 1 x Sinn Féin
2014-2019 Change: Sinn Féin gain from TUV

Three Mile Water

2014: 3 x DUP, 2 x UUP, 1 x Alliance
2019: 3 x DUP, 2 x Alliance, 1 x UUP
2014-2019 Change: Alliance gain from UUP

Changes during the term

† Co-options

‡ Changes in affiliation

– Suspensions
None

Last updated 19 June 2022.

Current composition: see Antrim and Newtownabbey Borough Council

Notes

References

2019 Northern Ireland local elections